This is a list of the National Register of Historic Places listings in Brazoria County, Texas.

This is intended to be a complete list of properties and districts listed on the National Register of Historic Places in Brazoria County, Texas. There are two districts and 10 individual properties listed on the National Register in the county. An additional property has been removed from the register. Among the individually listed properties are one State Historic Site, two State Antiquities Landmarks, and four Recorded Texas Historic Landmarks while one district contains additional Recorded Texas Historic Landmarks.

Current listings

The publicly disclosed locations of National Register properties and districts may be seen in a mapping service provided.

|}

Former listings

|}

See also

National Register of Historic Places listings in Texas
Recorded Texas Historic Landmarks in Brazoria County

References

External links

Registered Historic Places
Brazoria County